Vyacheslav Kutuzin (born July 12, 1973) is a Soviet sprint canoer who competed for the Unified Team at the 1992 Summer Olympics in Barcelona. He was eliminated in the semifinals of the K-4 1000 m event.

References
Sports-Reference.com profile

1973 births
Canoeists at the 1992 Summer Olympics
Living people
Olympic canoeists of the Unified Team
Soviet male canoeists
Russian male canoeists
Place of birth missing (living people)